Girolamo Martini (1587–1648) was a Roman Catholic prelate who served as Bishop of Ugento (1636–1648).

Biography
Girolamo Martini was born in Naples, Italy and ordained a priest in 1613.
On 3 October 1636, he was selected as Bishop of Ugento and confirmed by Pope Urban VIII on 30 March 1637. On 26 April 1637, he was consecrated bishop by Luigi Caetani, Cardinal-Priest of Santa Pudenziana with Alessandro Gallo, Bishop of Massa Lubrense, and Antonio Tornielli, Bishop of Novara, as co-consecrators. He served as Bishop of Ugento until his death in 1648.

References

External links and additional sources
 (for Chronology of Bishops) 
 (for Chronology of Bishops) 

1587 births
1648 deaths
17th-century Italian Roman Catholic bishops
Bishops appointed by Pope Urban VIII